Chills is a feeling of coldness occurring during a high fever, but sometimes is also a common symptom which occurs alone in specific people. It occurs during fever due to the release of cytokines and prostaglandins as part of the inflammatory response, which increases the set point for body temperature in the hypothalamus. The increased set point causes the body temperature to rise (pyrexia), but also makes the patient feel cold or chills until the new set point is reached. Shivering also occurs along with chills because the patient's body produces heat during muscle contraction in a physiological attempt to increase body temperature to the new set point. When it does not accompany a high fever, it is normally a light chill. 

Sometimes a chill of medium power and short duration may occur during a scare, especially in scares of fear, commonly interpreted like or confused by trembling.

Severe chills with violent shivering are called rigors.

Causes

Chills are commonly caused by inflammatory diseases, such as influenza. It is also common in urinary tract infections. Malaria is one of the common reasons for chills and rigors. In malaria, the parasites enter the liver, grow there and then attack the red blood cells which causes rupture of these cells and release of a toxic substance hemozoin which causes chills recurring every 3 to 4 days. Sometimes they happen in specific people almost all the time, in a slight power, or it less commonly happens in a generally healthy person.

See also
 Cold chill
 Goose bumps
 Night sweats

References

External links 

Symptoms and signs
Cold
Thermoregulation

fr:Frissonnement